Qeshlaq-e Galam Ali Safar (also Romanized as Qeshlāq-e Galam ʿAlī Şafar) is a village in Qeshlaq-e Sharqi Rural District, Qeshlaq Dasht District, Bileh Savar County, Ardabil Province, Iran. At the 2006 census, its population was 61, in 14 families.

References 

Towns and villages in Bileh Savar County